Pete Stollery (born 24 July 1960 in Halifax, UK) is a British composer, specialising in electroacoustic music.

Stollery studied with Jonty Harrison at the University of Birmingham from 1979 to 1996, and is currently Professor in Composition and Electroacoustic Music at the University of Aberdeen.

His work Shortstuff was awarded a Special Prize at the Musica Nova competition in Prague in 1994.  Onset/Offset has received honorable mentions at the 1996 Stockholm Electronic Arts Award  and the 1998 Pierre Schaeffer competition. Altered Images received Second Prize in the São Paulo competition in 1997. His music was featured at the ISCM World Music Days in Germany in 1995.

In 2008, Stollery's scènes, rendez-vous was featured at the Signal & Noise festival in Vancouver and at the sound festival in Aberdeenshire.

Activities

He chaired the Sonic Arts Network from 1985 to 2003 and edits its annual Journal of Electroacoustic Music. He is a founder member of invisiblEARts, a group of sound artists based in Scotland, also including Simon Atkinson, Robert Dow, Alistair MacDonald, Pippa Murphy, Nick Virgo and Pete Dowling.

Stollery is one of the founders of the Sound Festival in the north-east of Scotland, a month-long festival of new music.

Recordings 
Solo Recordings
 Un son peut en cacher un autre (empreintes DIGITALes, IMED 0678, 2006)

Compilation Recordings

 Une Production Acousmatica (Acousmatica, CD1296, 1996) – Shioum
 Maximal Music 4 (PanAroma, CD199.003.658, 1998) – Altered Images
 50 ans de Musique Concrète (Acousmatica, CD1298, 1998) – Onset/Offset
 Electroacoustic Music 3 (Electroshock, ELCD010, 1999) – Onset/Offset
 Electroacoustic Music 6 (Electroshock, ELCD020, 2000) – Peel
 Sonic Art from... (MPS, MPSCD013, 1999) – ABZ/A, Shortstuff
 Legacies (Sargasso, SCD28046, 2003) – Onset/Offset, Altered Images
 Florida Electroacoustic Music Festival, Vol 1 (EMF, EMF131, 2003) – Squirt (Griffin Campbell, alto saxophone)
 You Are Here (Accidental Records, ac07 cd, 2003) – Onset/Offset
 Vibro 3 – The Citizen Band Issue (Avence Double Entendre, 2005) – Serendipities an Synchronicities
 Drift: Resonant Cities (New Media Scotland, 2007) – ABZ/A
 Deep Wireless 6 (New Adventures in Sound Art, 2009) – Still Voices

Internet
 Far Afield; A Webbed Hand Compilation (Webbed Hand Records, Webbed Hand 055, 2005) – Banchory Ears
 Football Sound Narratives (Binauralmedia.org, Nodar 001, 2010) – Back to Square One

List of works 
Acousmatic/Soundscape

 Cloches (1987)
 Shortstuff (1993)
 Shioum (1994)
 Altered Images (1995)
 Onset/Offset (1996)
 Peel (1997)
 ABZ/A (1998)
 Vox Magna (2003)
 Banchory Ears (2004)
 Serendipities and Synchronicities (2004)
 Fields of Silence (2005)
 Still Voices (2005)
 Scènes, rendez-vous (2006)
 Back to Square One (2007)

Electroacoustic with instruments/voices

 Myth (1986), for four amplified voices (SATB) and live electronics
 Faible (1987), for electric harp and live electronics
 Squirt (1994), for alto saxophone and digital music
 Thickness (2000), for flute, viola and digital music
 Planar (2006), for trumpet and digital music
 bɜ:dz (2008), for organ and digital music
 74 Degrees North (2010), electroacoustic score for opera with Paul Mealor

Multimedia Music and Sound Design
 Archaeolink (1997)
 Our Dynamic Earth (1999)
 Magna Science Adventure Centre (2000)
 Saint Patrick Centre (2000)
 Norwich Millenium Library (2001)
 Benjamin Franklin House (2006)

References

External links 
 personal site
 Pete Stollery on electrocd.com
 invisiblEARts
  sound festival
 invisiblEARts

Living people
Scottish classical composers
20th-century classical composers
21st-century classical composers
Electroacoustic music composers
British male classical composers
1960 births
Alumni of the University of Birmingham
20th-century Scottish musicians
20th-century British composers
20th-century British male musicians
21st-century British male musicians